Alexandra Katehakis is the Clinical Director of Center for Healthy Sex in Los Angeles and an author. Katehakis is a clinical supervisor at American Association of Sex Educators, Counselors and Therapists (AASECT) and clinical supervisor and member of the teaching faculty for the International Institute for Trauma and Addiction Professionals (IITAP) a national certifying body for sex addiction therapists. She is a regular contributor to Psychology Today and The Huffington Post, as well as a panelist at sexuality conferences and public events.

Biography
Alexandra Katehakis holds a doctorate in Human Sexuality from the Institute for Advanced Study of Human Sexuality, and is a licensed psychotherapist (MFT) with a 1997 graduate degree from Antioch University. She holds licensure and certification with several different mental health organizations: Certified Sex Addiction Therapist (CSAT-S) with the International Institute for Trauma and Addiction Professionals (IITAP); Certified Sex Therapist (CST-S) with the American Association of Sex Educators Counselors and Therapists (AASECT); Licensed Marriage and Family Therapist (MFT) with the California Board of Behavioral Sciences (BBS).

She joined the Walking Theater Group in 1992 at the invitation of actor Joseph Culp who co-founded the process with John Cogswell. She later co-founded the Walking-In-Your-Shoes Group with Culp and shared in the further development of this transpersonal body mind process.

In 1997, Katehakis was one of the early practitioners in the field of sex addiction. She became certified as a sex addiction therapist by Patrick Carnes. In her practice, Katehakis focuses on treating sexual dysfunction, sexual anorexia, sexual addiction and love addiction in individuals and couples. Her first book, Erotic Intelligence, offers a healthy model of sexuality for sex addicts allowing for the diversity of erotic expression while raising the possibility of consecrating sex as a spiritual act. Since 2006, Katehakis has studied affective neuroscience with Allan N. Schore, incorporating Affect Regulation Theory and interpersonal neurobiology into her Psychobiological Approach to Sex Addiction Treatment (PASAT).

In 2009, Katehakis’ article “Affective Neuroscience and the Treatment of Sexual Addiction” was published in Sexual Addiction and Compulsivity: The Journal of Treatment and Prevention. The article focused on the neuropsychobiological impact of early childhood trauma on the affective, cognitive, and behavioral development of sexual addicts.

In 2016, the California Association of Marriage and Family Therapists awarded Mirror of Intimacy with the Clark Vincent Award and in 2015, the American Association of Sex Educators, Counselors and Therapists awarded co-authors Alexandra Katehakis and Tom Bliss with the AASECT 2015 Book of the Year Award.  Katehakis is the 2012 recipient of the Carnes Award, an acknowledgement for contributions to the field of sex addiction, presented by the Society for the Advancement of Sexual Health (SASH). She was also a co-recipient of the 2013 Clark Vincent Award from the California Association of Marriage and Family Therapists (CAMFT) for her role as a contributing author to the clinical textbook, Making Advances: A Comprehensive Guide for Treating Female Sex and Love Addicts. In 2013, Katehakis joined the clinical team at the Meadows inpatient trauma and addiction rehabilitation center in Arizona as a Senior Fellow.

From February 2015 until January 2018,  Katehakis appeared as a regular guest expert weekly every Friday on "Dr. Drew Midday Live with Mike Catherwood" alongside Drew Pinsky and Mike Catherwood on KABC (AM). From 2011 to 2016, Katehakis was a regular contributor to Psychology Today and The Huffington Post, writing their annual Best and Worst Sex List. Katehakis makes appearances on radio, film and television news shows, as well as online and print interviews. Notable appearances include Inside Hollywood, Spike TV, Los Angeles Times and CNN. She has appeared on panels at national conferences to discuss sex addiction alongside the likes of Daniel J. Siegel and Christopher Kennedy Lawford, as well as movie screening panel discussions for Shame (2011 film) and, Thanks for Sharing (2012 film), with the film's co-writer Matt Winston.

During the fall of 2017, amidst revelations of sexual abuse by movie producer Harvey Weinstein and others, Katehakis offered her expertise on sex addiction to several publications, including Rolling Stone, the Washington Post, the London Times, and others.

In May 2018, Katehakis received the Leadership Award from the International Institute for Trauma and Addiction Professionals (IITAP).

Publications 
 Papers
 
 
 
 
 

Katehakis, Alexandra (September and October 2016). "Sex Addiction: Holistic Treatment Goals and Protocols for Body, Brain, and Relationship". The Neuropsychotherapist.
Katehakis, Alexandra (Winter, 2017). "Sexual Fantasy and Adult Attunement". The American Journal of Play. 9 (2): 252–270.

 Books
 Erotic Intelligence: Igniting Hot, Healthy Sex While in Recovery from Sex Addiction (Health Communications, 2010) 
 Making Advances: A Comprehensive Guide for Treating Female Sex and Love Addicts (SASH, 2012) 
 Mirror of Intimacy: Daily Reflections on Emotional and Erotic Intelligence (CHS, 2014) 
 Sex Addiction as Affect Dysregulation: A Neurobiologically Informed Holistic Treatment (W. W. Norton & Company, 2016) 
 Sexual Reflections: A Workbook for Designing and Celebrating Your Sexual Health Plan (CHS, 2018)

References

External links
 Center for Healthy Sex
 YouTube: Center for Healthy Sex
 Alexandra Katehakis blog at Huffington Post
 Sex, Lies & Trauma blog at Psychology Today
 The Society for the Advancement of Sexual Health
 American Association of Sexuality Educators, Counselors and Therapists
 International Institute for Trauma and Addiction Professionals
 The Society for the Advancement of Sexual Health (SASH)
 Alex Katehakis Podcast

Living people
Year of birth missing (living people)
American self-help writers
American psychotherapists
Sex therapists
Sexual addiction